The Financial Advisor to the Chief of Staff is a role assumed by the head of the Budgeting Directorate of Israel’s Ministry of Defense. The Advisor is responsible for handling the budgeting for the Israel Defense Forces arms, the financial planning for the military, and coordinating these with Ministry of Finance. As of July 2021, the Advisor is Brigadier-General Colonel (Tat-Aluf) Dr Gil Pinchas.

References

Financial advisors
Israel Defense Forces